Scott Andrews (born December 28, 1974) is a Canadian politician. He represented the Newfoundland and Labrador electoral district of Avalon from his election in the 2008 Canadian federal election until his defeat in the 2015 federal election. Originally a member of the Liberal Party, he most recently sat as an independent.

Prior to being elected MP, he served on the Conception Bay South Town Council.

Life and career
Andrews was born in St. John's, Newfoundland. He served as a Member of the Standing Committee on Fisheries and Oceans and a Member of the Standing Committee on Veterans Affairs.

Inspired by the documentary Dear Zachary, Andrews introduced Bill C-464 on October 23, 2009, and received unanimous support from all political parties in the House of Commons to advance the bill to the Standing Committee on Justice & Human Rights on December 4, 2009. Andrews was moved to bring this bill forward in memory of Zachary Turner, a child whose mother killed him. The bill seeks to change the Criminal Code of Canada to allow the courts to justify refusing bail to those accused of serious crimes in the name of protecting their children. In December 2010, Zachary's Bill became law when Governor General David Johnston gave it Royal Assent. This marked the first time a Member of Parliament from Newfoundland and Labrador successfully passed a Private Member's Bill.

Andrews was re-elected in the 2011 general election, defeating Conservative Senator and former MP Fabian Manning a second time.

On November 5, 2014, Andrews and Massimo Pacetti were both suspended from the Liberal Party caucus by leader Justin Trudeau, following allegations of personal misconduct laid by two unnamed New Democratic Party MPs (in 2018 it was revealed that one of the MPs was Christine Moore). Both Andrews and Pacetti opted to sit as independent MPs pending investigation of the complaints.  On March 14, 2015, it was reported that Trudeau had deemed Andrews' and Pacetti's reported actions serious enough that he had decided to expel them from the Liberal caucus permanently and forbid them from running as Liberals in the next election. On March 19, Andrews announced that he had accepted the findings of the investigation and would serve out his term as an independent. Andrews ran for re-election in the 2015 federal election as an independent candidate, but he was defeated by Liberal nominee Ken McDonald. Andrews placed second with 17.8% of the vote, besting both the New Democratic and Conservative candidates.

Electoral career

References

External links

Members of the House of Commons of Canada from Newfoundland and Labrador
Members of the United Church of Canada
Liberal Party of Canada MPs
Living people
Newfoundland and Labrador municipal councillors
1974 births
People from Conception Bay South
Politicians from St. John's, Newfoundland and Labrador
Independent MPs in the Canadian House of Commons
Memorial University of Newfoundland alumni
Independent candidates in the 2015 Canadian federal election